Phantoms is a horror novel by American writer Dean Koontz, first published in 1983.  The story is a version of the now-debunked urban legend involving a village mysteriously vanishing at Angikuni Lake.

The novel includes many literary tips of the hat to the work of H. P. Lovecraft, including the suggestion that the novel's 'Ancient Enemy' is Lovecraft's god Nyarlathotep, also known as the 'Crawling Chaos'; and the fact that character of the air force specialist in potential contact with non-human intelligence is named 'Captain Arkham' (cf. Lovecraft's invention Arkham). Most of these Lovecraftian references were excised from the 1998 film version of Koontz's novel.

Plot summary
Jenny and Lisa Paige, two sisters, return to Jenny's hometown of Snowfield, California, a small ski resort village nestled in the Sierra-Nevada Mountains where Jenny works as a doctor, and find no one alive. The few bodies they find are either mutilated, or reveal some strange form of death. Finally, after growing more alarmed by the town's mysterious and alarming situation Jenny manages to call police in a neighboring town to come help.

Together, the women and the police, led by Sheriff Bryce Hammond, are able to request help from the military Biological Investigations Unit. The police managed to find only one clue as to what was causing the town's disappearances and deaths. A victim of whatever was trying to kill him managed to write the name Timothy Flyte on a mirror moments before he was killed. Flyte is a British academic and author of a book, The Ancient Enemy. His book catalogs and describes various mass vanishings of people in different parts of the world over the centuries.

It is discovered that the town was built over the hibernating place of one such Enemy, a creature known as an amoeboid shapeshifter. This Ancient Enemy rarely feeds, but when it does, the effects are devastating. It was theorized that the Enemy either caused or aided in the extinction of the dinosaurs, as well as many of the great mysterious mass vanishings: Mayan civilization, Roanoke, ghost ships, etc.

The creature consumes other life forms to increase its mass and is able to perfectly mimic other creatures. It can create small "probes" or "phantoms" imitating consumed life forms to go forth and hunt more prey, obeying the orders of its "hive mind"; in addition the creature absorbs the mental capacity of those it consumes.

Its only vital organ is a nucleus located in the center of its main body. The creature's cells are similar in molecular structure to fossil fuels; upon discovering this the scientists use oil-eating bacteria to destroy the Enemy's core or brain (the genetically modified bacteria are the real-life creations of Ananda Mohan Chakrabarty).

Court case
In 1992, Koontz filed suit against Zebra Books for the misappropriation of Phantoms in two titles Zebra published by author "Pauline Dunn" (in actuality sisters Dawn Pauline Dunn and Susan Hartzell collaborating under a pen name).  Spotted by a reader who informed Koontz's publisher, the two books in question - The Crawling Dark and Demonic Color - mimicked Phantoms extensively and even copied passages word-for-word.  The legal team for Koontz won, resulting in the sisters returning their advances for both books and Zebra placing an ad in Publishers Weekly acknowledging the plagiarism and withdrawing both titles.

Film adaptation

Phantoms was adapted into a movie in 1998 starring Peter O'Toole, Rose McGowan, Liev Schreiber, Ben Affleck, and Joanna Going.  It was directed by Joe Chappelle, produced by Neo Art & Logic, and released by Dimension Films. It was filmed in Colorado.

External links
 Phantoms Book Review

References

1983 American novels
Novels by Dean Koontz
American horror novels
American thriller novels
American novels adapted into films
Fictional amorphous creatures
Novels set in California
G. P. Putnam's Sons books
Hive minds in fiction
Biological weapons in popular culture